Glenmor was the stage name of Emile Le Scanf (1931–1996), a Breton protest singer who sought to preserve the Breton language and adapt local traditions of folk singing to the radical culture of the 1960s and 70s. He is also known by the Breton name Milig Ar Skañv.

Early career
Emile Le Scanf was born in 1931 at Mael-Carhaix. In 1941, he entered the small seminary in Quintin. After his military service in Paris, he obtained a licence de philosophie at Rennes in 1952. He then travelled extensively in Italy, Greece, Turkey, Yugoslavia and Soviet Union until 1954. During this period he began writing and composing.

His musical career really began in 1959 with a recital in Paris before a small audience. He later released his first album as "Glenmor", Glenmor à la Mutualité. His stage name was derived from words for land (glen) and sea (mor) in Breton. His distinctive style led to popularity.

His songs aggressively asserted the unique cultural identity of Brittany. He portrayed himself as a political radical with anti-clerical and anarchist views. He wore a beard and his hair long, in a revival of the traditional Breton peasant style.

Activism
Actively engaged in Breton nationalism, Glenmor wrote the song le Kan bale lu poblek Breizh, later renamed Kan bale an ARB, which was the marching song of the ARB (Armée Révolutionnaire Bretonne; Breton Revolutionary Army). In June 1979, he participated in a hunger strike to protest against the detention of a Breton activist arrested following an attack against the Chateau of Versailles.

With his friends Alain Guel and Xavier Grall, he helped found the publishing house "Kelenn", where in 1968 he published Le Livre des Chansons. A few years later Grall published  Barde imaginé and La fête de la nuit (1972), works in which Glenmor is the main character, in the fictionalised form of the bard "Arzel". In the early 1970s he, Grall and Guel founded the newspaper la Nation bretonne, which was influential on the Breton intellectual elite.

In 1977, he appeared in Pierre Perrault's film C'etait un Québécois en Bretagne, madame! along with fellow Breton nationalist Meavenn. Both are portrayed as "poets of dispossession, the voices of a despairing national identity." Glenmor describes himself in the film as an "oral journalist with opinions".

In 1978, he was designated "Breton of the Year" by Armor Magazine. In 1990 he retired from performance to devote himself to writing.

He was decorated with the Order of the Ermine in 1990. He died six years later on June 18, 1996. Several thousand people attended his funeral in Mael-Carhaix . The tomb is inscribed with the words, "Émile LE SCANV (1931-1996) Et voici bien ma terre, la vallée de mes amours. Glenmor".

Discography
 GLENMOR single
 Quatre Chansons en Breton single Ed. Sked
 GLENMOR single Ed. Kornog
 KATTELL dit GLENMOR : Poèmes album Ed. Ternel
 KATTELL dit GLENMOR : Poèmes album Ed. Ternel
 GLENMOR A LA MUTUALITE album Ed. Ternel
 Cinq Chansons en Breton single Ed. Barclay
 Les Temps de la Colère single Ed. Barclay
 CET AMOUR-LA album Ed. Barclay
 HOMMAGE A MORVAN LEBESQUE album
 VIVRE album Ed. Le Chant du Monde LDX 74481
 PRINCES ENTENDEZ BIEN album Ed. Le Chant du Monde LDX 74503
 OUVREZ LES PORTES DE LA NUIT album Ed. le Chant du Monde
 E DIBENN MIZ GWENGOLO album Ed. Le Chant du Monde
 TOUS CES VINGT ANS DEJA... album Ed. Le Chant du Monde
 La Coupe et la Mémoire album Ed. Ar Folk
 TRISTAN CORBIERE : Le Paria dit par Glenmor album Ed. Ar Folk
 Si tu ne chantais pas pour eux à quoi bon demeurer album Ed. Stern Ha Lugern
 Après la Fleur le Fruit sous la Rose l'Épine album Ed. Escalibur
 EN BRETAGNE, NOCES ET FEST-NOZ album Ed. Barclay
 LES PRINCIPALES OEUVRES CD Prod. Ar Folk, Escalibur, Coop Breizh
 AN DISTRO "Et voici bien ma Terre..." CD Ed. Coop Breizh
 AN DISTRO "Ouvrez les Portes de la Nuits" CD Ed. Coop Breizh
 AN DISTRO "Apocaplypse" CD Ed. Coop Breizh
 HOMMAGE A GLENMOR CD Coop Breizh CD KAD 01 (2000)

Writings
 Livre des Chansons (Mutualité 67), éd. Kelenn, 1969, second edition, Stern ha Lugern, 1979
 Livre des Chansons, tome II (Bobino 73), éd. Ternel
 Sables et Dunes, éd. Ternel, 1971
 La Septième Mort, éd. Ternel, 1974, second edition, Libres Halliers, 1982
 Le Sang nomade, éd. Ternel, 1975
 Les emblaves et la moisson, éd. Stern ha Lugern, 1977
 Retraites paysannes, with typography and wood engravings by Claude Huart, éd. Ternel, 1977
 L'Homme du dernier jour, La Gacilly, éd. Artus, 1992
 Les Derniers Feux de la Vallée, Spézet, éd. Coop Breizh, 1995
 La Sanguine, Spézet, éd. Coop Breizh, 1996
 La Férule, Spézet, éd. Coop Breizh, 1997
 Xavier Grall in memoriam, Babel, 2000
 Kan ha diskan, Correspondences Grall-Glenmor, Spézet, Coop Breizh, 2007

Notes

1931 births
1996 deaths
Breton musicians
Breton-language poets
Breton-language singers
French  male singer-songwriters
Breton nationalists
University of Rennes alumni
20th-century French  male singers